Hi-Fi is a compilation album released by Compulsion in 1995.

Track listing
 "Plan"
 "Accident Ahead"
 "How Do I Breathe?"
 "A Little Mistake"
 "Yabba Yabba Yes Yes Yes"
 "Little Marks"
 "Mall Monarchy"
 "Easterman"
 "Pink And Forty-nine"
 "Ninefourth"
 "Why Do We Care?"

Sound studios 
Producer - Ian Caple, tracks: 1-3, 5, 6, 8-11
Producer - Compulsion, tracks 4 & 7
Tracks 8, 10 taken from the first EP (Fabulon Records Flon 1201, 1992)
Tracks 2, 3, 5 taken from the EP Casserole (Fabulon Records Flon 1202, 1993)
Tracks 1, 6, 9, 11 taken from the EP Safety (One Little Indian, 1993)
Tracks 4, 7 taken from the EP Mall Monarchy (One Little Indian, 1994)

Personnel
Josephmary - vocals, trombone
Garret Lee - vocals, guitar, electronics
Sid Rainey - bass
Jan-Willem Alkema - drums

References

1995 compilation albums
Compulsion (band) compilation albums